Kenneth Lawrence Ozmon,  (September 4, 1931 – February 23, 2022) was an American-born Canadian university administrator and Canada's longest serving university president for 21 consecutive years.

Biography
Born in Portsmouth, Virginia, he received a Bachelor of Arts degree in 1955 from St. Bernard College in Alabama, a Master of Arts in Psychology degree in 1963 from The Catholic University of America, and a PhD in Psychology in 1968 from the University of Maine.

He held various teaching positions in Alabama, Quebec (at Marianopolis College), Maine and California. From 1969 to 1972, he was the Associate Professor and Chairman of the Department of Psychology and Dean of Arts at the University of Prince Edward Island.

From 1979 to 2000, he was the President of Saint Mary's University in Halifax, Nova Scotia, serving for four terms. He was the thirteenth President of Mount Allison University. His term expired at the end of June 2006.

In 1998, he was made an Officer of the Order of Canada for his "outstanding contribution to education".

Ozmon died on February 23, 2022, at the age of 90.

References

Sources
 
 

1931 births
2022 deaths
American expatriate academics
American expatriates in Canada
Canadian university and college chief executives
Canadian university and college faculty deans
Officers of the Order of Canada
Catholic University of America alumni
People from Portsmouth, Virginia
Academic staff of the University of Prince Edward Island